Diprotochaeta is a genus of moths in the family Gelechiidae. It contains the species Diprotochaeta fallax, which is found in Indonesia (Java).

References

Gelechiinae